The Dry Tortugas Light is a lighthouse located on Loggerhead Key, three miles west of Fort Jefferson, Florida. It was taken out of operation in 2015. It has also been called the Loggerhead Lighthouse. It has been said to be "a greater distance from the mainland than any other light in the world."

History

In 1856, Capt. Daniel Phineas Woodbury supervised construction of the lighthouse, based on an 1855 design by Capt. Horatio Wright, and it became operational in 1858.

When originally constructed the walls of the tower were left its natural, yellowish-red brick color. The lens was a first order Fresnel lens which was manufactured by the French firm of L. Sautter and Company. In addition to the tower, the light station included a brick two-story dwelling with Greek Revival features, a brick two-story kitchen (still standing), and oil house, wash house, outhouses and cisterns.

Forty-one year old Benjamin H. Kerr was appointed head keeper and received a salary of $600 per year. He had previously been keeper at Garden Key since 1850. Charles H. Perry was appointed 1st assistant keeper and John Fritz as the 2nd Assistant keeper. Both assistants received $300 per year.

The Loggerhead Key lighthouse has a stone foundation and a conical brick tower. The tower was later painted black on the upper part and white below. A radio room is attached to the base of the tower. A later replacement lens, a second order clamshell revolving Fresnel lens, is now on display at the United States Coast Guard Aids to Navigation School in Yorktown, Virginia. The light was automated in 1988.

The first lighthouse in the Dry Tortugas was on Garden Key, and became operational in 1826. After several proposals for a new lighthouse on the "outer shoals" of the Dry Tortugas, a new lighthouse was built on Loggerhead Key and completed in 1858 at a cost of US$35,000, which was the amount that had been projected to upgrade the existing lighthouse on Garden Key.

The Dry Tortugas lighthouse, along with the Garden Key lighthouse at Fort Jefferson, were the only lights on the Gulf coast that stayed in full operation throughout the American Civil War.  A civilian prisoner of Fort Jefferson, John W. Adare and a companion, used planks to swim to the Key and stole the keeper's boat.  Although they made it to Havana, the Spanish authorities there extradited them back to Key West.  Undeterred, Adare attempted a second escape, one in which he needed a second plank for his ankle ball and chain.  This time the boat was locked and Adare was captured the next day.

The tower was damaged by a hurricane in October 1873 and plans were drawn up for a new tower. The tower was repaired by rebuilding the top  and extending the steel rods anchoring the lantern to the bottom of the tower. After the repaired tower survived another hurricane in September 1875, the plans for a new tower were deferred and eventually dropped.

The Dry Tortugas Light received an electric lamp in 1931, becoming the most powerful lighthouse in America, with three million candela. The rotating beacon stopped working in April 2014, and was formally decommissioned in December 2015.

Head keepers

 Benjamin H. Kerr (1858 – 1861)
 James P. Lightburn (1861 – 1862)
 Robert H. Thompson (1862 – 1872)
 William B. Taylor (1872)
 Thomas Moore (1872 – 1881)
 Robert H. Thompson (1881 – 1888)
 Charles A. Roberts (1888)
 George R. Billberry (1888 – 1907)
 Edgar J. Russell (1907 – at least 1915)
 Charles Johnson (at least 1917 – at least 1921)
 Andrew M. Albury (1928 – at least 1947)

In later years, before the light was automated, the lighthouse was manned by Coast Guardsmen who rotated on and off the island every few days.

See also

 List of lighthouses in Florida
 List of lighthouses in the United States

References

External links

 Dry Tortugas National Park, Dry Tortugas Light Station. Ancillary Structures Historic Structure Report National Park Service
 Dry Tortugas National Park, Dry Tortugas Light Station. Keeper's Residence Historic Structure Report National Park Service
 Dry Tortugas National Park, Dry Tortugas Light Station. Lighthouse and Oil House Historic Structure Report National Park Service

Lighthouses completed in 1858
Lighthouses in Monroe County, Florida
Dry Tortugas National Park
1858 establishments in Florida